Herman I was bishop of Bamberg from 1065 until 1075. He was a royal chaplain of King Henry IV of Germany before his appointment to the bishopric. His favoritism towards monastic communities brought him into conflict with the canons of the Bamberg Cathedral.

References

Sources

11th-century German Roman Catholic bishops
Roman Catholic bishops of Bamberg
Investiture Controversy